This article documents the timeline of transmission of COVID-19 during the pandemic in Belarus in 2021.

Timeline

January 2021

February 2021

March 2021

April 2021

May 2021

June 2021

July 2021

August 2021

September 2021

October 2021

November 2021

December 2021

See also 
 COVID-19 pandemic in Belarus
 2020 in Belarus
 Timeline of the COVID-19 pandemic in Belarus (2020)
 Timeline of the COVID-19 pandemic in Belarus (2022)

References

Belarus